Ilia Iliev Gruev (born 6 May 2000) is a Bulgarian professional footballer who plays as a midfielder for Werder Bremen. He has represented Bulgaria internationally at various youth levels.

Club career
Gruev made his professional debut for Werder Bremen in the second round of the 2020–21 DFB-Pokal on 23 December 2020, coming on as a substitute in the 87th minute for Jean-Manuel Mbom against Hannover 96. The away match finished as a 3–0 win for Bremen.

International career
Gruev has appeared for the Bulgaria under-17, under-18, under-19 and under-21 national teams. He received his first call-up for the senior national team on 5 September 2022, for the games of the UEFA Nations League games against Gibraltar and North Macedonia on 23 and 26 September 2022. He made his debut in the match against Gibraltar on 23 September, won 5–1 by Bulgaria.

Personal life
Gruev was born in Sofia, but also holds German citizenship. He is the son of Iliya Gruev, former Bulgarian international footballer and manager.

Career statistics

References

External links
 
 
 

2000 births
Living people
Footballers from Sofia
Bulgarian footballers
German footballers
Association football midfielders
Bulgaria youth international footballers
Bulgarian emigrants to Germany
Bundesliga players
2. Bundesliga players
Regionalliga players
SV Werder Bremen II players
SV Werder Bremen players